Grýtubakkahreppur (regionally also ) is a municipality located in northern-central Iceland, in Northeastern Region.

The amount of residence is approximately 400. it has a local convenience store, a bank, as well as a preschool and a grade school.

Geography 
Located on the eastern side of Eyjafjörður, north of Akureyri, Grýtubakki is located next to Dalvík and not too far from Húsavík. Its main settlement is the village Grenivík , which is located next to Kaldbakur mountain.

Sports
Local football club Magni Grenivík plays in the third tier of the Iceland football pyramid and play their home games at the Grenivíkurvöllur.

References

External links 
Official website 

Municipalities of Iceland
Northeastern Region (Iceland)